The Winter of Our Discontent is a 1983 American drama television film directed by Waris Hussein, based on the 1961 novel of the same name by John Steinbeck. The film stars Donald Sutherland, Teri Garr, and Tuesday Weld, who received a Primetime Emmy Award nomination for her performance.

Plot
The story is about a Long Islander named Ethan Allen Hawley (played by Donald Sutherland) who works as a clerk in a grocery store he used to own, but which is now owned by an Italian immigrant (played by Michael V. Gazzo). His wife (Teri Garr) and kids want more than what he can give them because of his lowly position.

He finds out that the immigrant that owns his store is an illegal alien, turns him in to the Immigration and Naturalization Service, and receives the store by deceiving the immigrant. Ethan continues to have feelings of depression and anxiety brought about by his uneasy relationship with his  wife and kids, risky flirtation with Margie Young-Hunt (Tuesday Weld), and a plan to sell his property and a house of a close friend to a banker who wants to build a shopping mall.

Cast
 Donald Sutherland as Ethan Hawley
 Teri Garr as Mary Hawley
 Tuesday Weld as Margie Young-Hunt
 Michael V. Gazzo as Marullo
 Richard Masur as Danny
 E. G. Marshall as Mr. Baker
 Kirk Brennan as Allen Hawley
 Amanita Hyldahl as Ellen Hawley
 Nan Martin as Mrs. Baker
 Macon McCalman as Reverend Sloane
 Ben Piazza as Louis Brock

Awards and nominations

External links
 

1983 films
1983 drama films
1983 television films
1980s English-language films
CBS network films
American drama television films
Hallmark Hall of Fame episodes
Films based on American novels
Films based on works by John Steinbeck
Films directed by Waris Hussein
Films scored by Mark Snow
Films set in Long Island
Films shot in California
1980s American films